Lepidochrysops flavisquamosa is a butterfly in the family Lycaenidae. It is found in Angola.

Adults have been recorded in October.

References

Butterflies described in 1959
Lepidochrysops
Endemic fauna of Angola
Butterflies of Africa